Madhugiri Shamarao Anathapadmanabha Rao (1926–1985) was a professor of sociology who had been a founder-member in 1959 of the Department of Sociology at the University of Delhi, India. He wrote and edited extensively on subjects such as the social aspects of nutrition, both urban and rural sociology, the sociology of migration, and social dominance. He conducted much fieldwork as a part of his researches.

Birth
Rao was born on 26 September 1926

Education and career
Before involvement at the University of Delhi, Rao had studied at the University of Bombay, and it was there that he formed a lifelong association with G. S. Ghurye. Rao went on to hold visiting appointments in both the United States (at Syracuse University and the University of Pennsylvania) and in Britain (at the School of Oriental and African Studies). He was a frequent participant in academic conferences and travelled widely in order to do so. Recognition of his work came in various forms, including receipt of the G. S. Ghurye Award in 1979, the S. C. Roy Memorial Gold Medal of The Asiatic Society in 1982, and the publication of at least one gedenkschrift.

Death and legacy
Rao died on 12 December 1985, at which point he was, according to Andre Beteille, "at the height of his professional career". Following his death, a memorial scholarship and an academic award were named for him.

Selected works

References

Further reading

1926 births
1985 deaths
University of Mumbai alumni
Delhi University alumni
Academic staff of Delhi University
People associated with SOAS University of London
University of Pennsylvania faculty
Syracuse University faculty
Indian sociologists